The 2022 AMA Supercross season is the 49th season of professional stadium off-road motorcycle racing in the United States.

Season overview
The season began on January 8 at Angel Stadium in Anaheim, California, running until the final race in Salt Lake City, in late May.

In round 3 at San Diego, Chase Sexton and Michael Mosiman each won their first events in the 450cc and 250cc classes respectively.

Eli Tomac won his sixth career Daytona Supercross race at Round 9, eclipsing Ricky Carmichael's record for the most top class wins at Daytona. With the victory, he also tied Ryan Villopoto for the fifth-most wins in the AMA's premier class.

Eli Tomac clinched the title at round 16 in Denver, CO with a 5th place finish over runner-up, and winner of the race, Jason Anderson.

Season results

Championship standings

450SX Rider Standings

250SX West Rider Standings

250SX East Rider Standings

Television coverage
The 2022 season is covered in its entirety by the NBC family of networks, including NBC, CNBC, USA Network and Peacock.

 Source:

References

AMA Supercross Championship
AMA Supercross